The term Serbian Catholic Church can refer to:

 Catholic Church in Serbia, communities and institutions of the Catholic Church in Serbia (including the Latin Church)
 Greek Catholic Eparchy of Ruski Krstur, an eparchy (diocese) for Eastern Catholics of the Byzantine Rite in Serbia
 Serbian Old-Catholic Church, a former old-catholic church in Serbia, that existed in the second half of the 20th century

See also 
 Serb-Catholic movement in Dubrovnik
 Serbian Church (disambiguation)
 Serbian Orthodox Church (disambiguation)
 Greek Catholic Church
 Albanian Catholic Church
 Belarusian Catholic Church
 Bulgarian Catholic Church
 Croatian Catholic Church
 Hungarian Catholic Church
 Romanian Catholic Church
 Russian Greek Catholic Church
 Slovak Catholic Church
 Ukrainian Catholic Church